

Localities 
Andramasina, a municipality in Analamanga.

Names 
Andriamasinavalona (1675–1710) - a king of Merina.